Overbeck is a surname of German origin. It may refer to:
Carla Overbeck (1968–) is an American soccer player and longtime member and captain of the United States women's national soccer team.
Bill Overbeck, fictional character in the 2008 horror video game Left 4 Dead.
Christian Adolph Overbeck (1755–1821) was a German poet, and the Burgomaster of Lübeck.
Franz Overbeck (1837–1905) was a German Protestant theologian, best known in regard to his friendship with Friedrich Nietzsche.
Franz-Josef Overbeck (born 1964), German Roman Catholic bishop
Henry J. Overbeck (1853–1921), American politician.
Johann Friedrich Overbeck (1789–1869) was a German painter and member of the Nazarene movement.
Johannes Overbeck (1826–1895) was a German archaeologist and art historian who was born in Antwerp.
Julian Joseph Overbeck (1820–1905) was a former Roman Catholic priest who converted to Eastern Orthodoxy and became a pioneer of Western Rite Orthodoxy.
Otto Overbeck (1860–1937) was an early 20th-century advocate of electrotherapy. He was the son of Julian Joseph Overbeck.
The Overbeck Sisters were four women potters and artists of the Arts and Crafts Movement who worked in Cambridge City, Indiana from 1911 until 1955.
T. Jerome Overbeck is an American author and Christian theologian who is also a prominent priest of the Society of Jesus. 
Wilcox P. Overbeck (1912–1980) was an American electrical and nuclear engineer.